Ghoti Budruk is a census town in Nashik district in the Indian state of Maharashtra.It is a special growth center in Nashik Metropolitan Region.Ghoti Budruk, khambale and Dahalewadi together forms a Growth Center.It is the biggest town and market place in Igatpuri.It is also called as mini Mumbai. It is situated on the bank of Darna River. This small town is having largest number of hospitals in Igatpuri. So it is also called as town of hospitals and medicals.

Demographics
 India census, Ghoti Budruk had a population of 20,204. Males constitute 52% of the population and females 48%. Ghoti Budruk has an average literacy rate of 70%, higher than the national average of 59.5%: male literacy is 77%, and female literacy is 62%. In Ghoti Budruk, 16% of the population is under 6 years of age.

References

External links
NashikDiary.com - Travel Information of Nashik City and District
 MarathiMati.com
 Ghoti Budruk short Documentary by Harshad Khandare

Cities and towns in Nashik district